Rock Run is a tributary of Martins Creek in Lower Makefield Township in Bucks County, Pennsylvania in the United States.

Statistics
Rock Run was entered into the Geographic Names Information System of the U.S. Geological Survey on 2 August 1979 as identification number 1185276. It is also listed in the Pennsylvania Gazatteer of Streams as identification number 02922.

Course
After about a mile it then turns east, then south and southwest until it discharges at Martins Creek's 3.20 river mile.

Geology
Atlantic Plain
Atlantic Coastal Plain Province
Lowland and Intermediate Upland Section
Trenton Gravel
Pensauken and Bridgeton Formations
Rock Run rises in the Felsic Gneiss formation laid during the Precambrian, light buff to pink and medium to fine grained rock, mineralogy includes quartz, microcline, pyroxene, and biotite. As it flows east, it runs into the Pensauken and Bridgeton Formations laid down during the Tertiary period, yellow to reddish brown feldspathic quartz sand, coarse gravel, and boulder. Then it finally flows into the Trenton Gravel Formation from the Quaternary, consisting of feldspathic quartz sand which is reddish brown, yellow, and white, with some beds of gravel.

Crossings and Bridges

See also
List of rivers of the United States
List of rivers of Pennsylvania
List of Delaware River tributaries

References

Rivers of Bucks County, Pennsylvania
Rivers of Pennsylvania
Tributaries of the Delaware River